The 1945 Princeton Tigers football team was an American football team that represented Princeton University as an independent during the 1945 college football season. In its first season under head coach Charlie Caldwell, the team compiled a 2–3–2 record and was outscored by a total of 112 to 69. Princeton played its 1945 home games at Palmer Stadium in Princeton, New Jersey.

Schedule

References

Princeton
Princeton Tigers football seasons
Princeton Tigers football